Aaron Joshua Amadi-Holloway (born 1 February 1993) is a Welsh professional footballer who plays as a striker for Hereford.

Career

Early career
Born in Cardiff, Amadi-Holloway was a part of the Cardiff City youth system before joining Bristol City in 2011. On 24 November that year he was loaned to Conference Premier club Bath City until January, alongside Joe Bryan.  He made five appearances on loan at Bath but was released by Bristol City in January 2014 having not made a first team appearance for them.

On 12 February 2014 Amadi-Holloway joined Newport County and made his Football League debut in the League Two 4–1 loss at Morecambe on 11 March 2014 as a 65th-minute substitute for Robbie Willmott. He made three more substitute appearances and was released by Newport at the end of the 2013–14 season.

Wycombe Wanderers
Amadi-Holloway signed for Wycombe Wanderers of League Two on 10 August 2014 on a deal until January 2015. On 4 October, he scored his first career goal, an added-time header from Joe Jacobson's corner kick to secure a 1–1 home draw against Northampton Town. The following 2 May, he scored again in a 3–2 win in the reverse fixture to qualify the Chairboys for the play-offs.

A week later in the first leg of the semi-finals, Amadi-Holloway scored in a 3–2 victory at Plymouth Argyle (5–3 aggregate). In the final at Wembley Stadium against Southend United on 23 May, he scored a sudden-death penalty in the shootout after a 1–1 draw, but his team lost it 7–6.

Amadi-Holloway joined struggling League One side Oldham Athletic on an emergency loan until the end of the season on 12 February 2016. He played ten games for them and scored twice in a 3–2 home loss to Greater Manchester neighbours Rochdale on 19 March, as the Latics avoided relegation.

Later career
Amadi-Holloway signed for Fleetwood Town of League One on a two-year contract in May 2016, for an undisclosed fee. He made his debut in the season opener against Northampton on 6 August, replacing Ashley Hunter for the last 15 minutes of a 1–1 away draw. Four days later, he scored his first goal against Leeds United in an EFL Cup first round game four days later, opening a 2–2 draw at Highbury Stadium which Leeds won on penalties.

On 20 January 2017 Amadi-Holloway returned to Oldham Athletic on a permanent deal. He scored four times in 42 games in 2017–18 as they were relegated to League Two, including a last-minute winner as a late substitute in a 2–1 victory against rivals Bury at Boundary Park on 24 October.

On 13 July 2018 Amadi-Holloway joined League One side Shrewsbury Town for an undisclosed fee. He played 38 total games and scored three times.

On 25 June 2019, Amadi-Holloway moved outside of British football for the first time when he signed for A-League side Brisbane Roar, becoming the third signing the club announced under Robbie Fowler.

On 16 October 2020, he moved to new ISL side SC East Bengal with his former coach Robbie Fowler. He made his debut for the club on 15 December against Hyderabad FC.

On 23 July 2021, Amadi-Holloway returned to England to join League One side Burton Albion on a one-year deal. The following 28 January, he joined EFL League Two side Barrow on loan for the remainder of the 2021–22 season. Amadi-Holloway was released at the end of his one-year deal.

On 5 August 2022, Amadi-Holloway dropped into non-league football joining National League North side Hereford FC.

International
Born in Wales, Amadi-Holloway is of Nigerian descent. He attained 10 caps for Wales at under-17 level and represented Wales at under-19 level.

Career statistics

References

External links

1993 births
Living people
Footballers from Cardiff
Welsh footballers
Wales youth international footballers
Welsh people of Nigerian descent
Association football forwards
Bristol City F.C. players
Bath City F.C. players
Newport County A.F.C. players
Wycombe Wanderers F.C. players
Oldham Athletic A.F.C. players
Fleetwood Town F.C. players
Shrewsbury Town F.C. players
Brisbane Roar FC players
East Bengal Club players
Burton Albion F.C. players
Barrow A.F.C. players
Hereford F.C. players
National League (English football) players
English Football League players
A-League Men players
Indian Super League players
Welsh expatriate footballers
Welsh expatriate sportspeople in Australia
Expatriate soccer players in Australia
Expatriate footballers in India